Carol Jordan may refer to:

Inspector Carol Jordan, a character from the series Wire in the Blood played by Hermione Norris
Inspector Carol Jordan, a character from the book, Beneath the Bleeding, basis for the series Wire in the Blood
Carol Jordan, a victim of spree killer Philip John Smith

See also
Carole Jordan (born 1941), first female president of the Royal Astronomical Society